In mathematics, L-group or l-group may refer to the following groups:
 The Langlands dual, LG, of a reductive algebraic group G
 A group in L-theory, L(G)
 Lattice-ordered groups